Bell Irvin Wiley (January 5, 1906 – April 4, 1980) was an American historian who specialized in the American Civil War and was an authority on military history and the social history of common people. He died in Atlanta, Georgia, from a heart attack.

Background
Born in rural Halls, Tennessee, Wiley was one of 13 children, 11 of whom lived past infancy. The family did farm work, and Wiley had the experience of plowing behind a mule. His dislike for the drudgery of farm chores and the merciless Southern heat motivated him to plan a career in education.

Wiley's maternal grandfather had marched with the Army of Tennessee, fighting against Union General William Tecumseh Sherman’s army. While he barely remembered him, Wiley spent several summers as a boy with his widow, who often held him spellbound with her recollections of the period. Wiley's family frequently hosted both a Confederate and a Union soldier, who would entertain them with their accounts of what they experienced when each had opposed the other in battle.

Education
Wiley earned a BA at Asbury College in 1928 and a Ph.D. from Yale University in 1933, where he worked under Ulrich B. Phillips.  In 1934 Wiley became a professor of history at State Teachers College (now the University of Southern Mississippi). He married Mary Frances Harrison in 1937; they had two children. He served as professor of history at the University of Mississippi (1938-1943), Louisiana State University (1946-1949), and Emory University (1949-1974).

Legacy
The New York Civil War Round Table awards the Bell I. Wiley Award to deserving authors who write about Civil War themes.

Writings
 Cotton and Slavery in the History of West Tennessee (1929)
 Southern Negroes, 1861-1865 (1938) typescript in archives
 The Life of Johnny Reb: The Common Soldier of the Confederacy (LSU Press, 1943) read online excerpt and text search 2007 edition
 The Plain People of the Confederacy (LSU Press, 1943) read online excerpt and text search 2000 edition
  Greenfield, Kent Roberts, Robert R. Palmer, Bell I. Wiley. The Organization of Ground Combat Troops (1947) on World War II
 Palmer, Robert Roswell, Bell I. Wiley, William R. Keast. The Procurement and Training of Ground Combat Troops (1948) on World War II read online
 The Life of Billy Yank: The Common Soldier of the Union (1952) read online excerpt and text search 2008 edition
 The Road to Appomattox (1956)
 Recollections of a Confederate Staff Officer by Brig. Gen. G. Moxley Sorrel, C.S.A. (ed.) (Tennessee: McCowat-Mercer Press, 1958)
 The Role of the Archivist in the Civil War Centennial (1961) read online
 Embattled Confederates: An Illustrated History of Southerners at War (Harper & Row, 1964) read online
 Confederate Women: Beyond the Petticoat  (1975)
 Slaves No More: Letters from Liberia, 1833-1869 (University of Kentucky Press, 1980) read online

Further reading
 Rank and file: Civil War essays in honor of Bell Irvin Wiley (1976)

References

External links 
Stuart A. Rose Manuscript, Archives, and Rare Book Library, Emory University: Bell Irvin Wiley papers, 1928-1981

1906 births
Asbury University alumni
Yale University alumni
University of Southern Mississippi faculty
University of Mississippi faculty
Emory University faculty
Louisiana State University faculty
Historians of the United States
Historians of the American Civil War
Historians of the Southern United States
1980 deaths
20th-century American historians
American male non-fiction writers
Harold Vyvyan Harmsworth Professors of American History
People from Halls, Tennessee
20th-century American male writers